The 1947–48 SK Rapid Wien season was the 50th season in club history.

Squad

Squad and statistics

Squad statistics

Fixtures and results

League

Cup

References

1947-48 Rapid Wien Season
Rapid
Austrian football championship-winning seasons